Toros Rasguélénian (12 December 1934 – 29 July 2020), known professionally as R. Toros, was a French sculptor.

Biography
Toros was born in Syria to an Armenian family. He left school at the age of 11 and worked as a welder, locksmith, and blacksmith. At 25, he had his own ironworking business. A church architect ordered a cross from him for the steeple of the Armenian Orthodox Church of Surp Kevork in Aleppo. During a trip to Armenia, he discovered the David of Sassoun statue. Upon the statue's discovery, Toros experienced a revelation and returned to Aleppo to begin sculpting. He started to sculpt metal and made fountains, and after several exhibitions he won his first sculpture prize in 1966, with L’Émancipation de la femme arabe.

In 1967, Toros went to France for artistic studies. He met numerous artists and sculptors who dissuaded him from entering the fine arts academies. Therefore, he relied on his personal experience to help him in his artistic career. He settled in Valence, then in Romans-sur-Isère, both in the Drôme region, where there was a large Armenian presence at the time. He made a large amount of monuments in memory of the victims of the Armenian genocide, of which his uncle was a victim. These monuments can be found in Valence, Aix-en-Provence, Marseille, and Saint-Étienne. He awarded the Trophée Toros to the best piece of Franco-Armenian literature published each year in Marseille.

R. Toros died on 29 July 2020 in Romans-sur-Isère at the age of 85.

Works

Exhibitions
Galerie Bost, Valence (1968)
Salon d'automne, Paris (1970)
Galerie Jean Dulac, Lyon (1972)
Galerie Pyramide, Vienna (1975)
Galerie Colette Dubois, Paris (1979-1980)
Fondation E Schigling Ottebeuren, Germany (1998)
Consortium International des Arts, Menton, Mégeve, Saint-Tropez (1996-2000)
Galerie Saint Hubert, Lyon
Rétrospective Musée d'Art contemporain, Montélimar (2012-2013)
Du Dessin à la sculpture - Musée International de la chaussure, Romans-sur-Isère (2016)
La Paix : Toros œuvre intégrale UNESCO, Paris (2017)

Monuments in Syria
La fontaine aux oiseaux, Aleppo (1965)
L'émancipation de la femme arabe, Aleppo (1966)

Bibliography
Ligne de femmes
Plénitude de Toros
Du dessin à la sculpture
Toros dinandier d'art
Toros Sculptures

Filmography
Le Voluptueux
Destin et Art
Un destin documentaire
Toros sculpteur

References

1934 births
2020 deaths
French sculptors
Syrian people of Armenian descent
Syrian emigrants to France
French people of Armenian descent
People from Aleppo